The spectral pygmy chameleon (Rhampholeon spectrum), also known as  western pygmy chameleon or Cameroon stumptail chameleon, is one of the so-called "dwarf" or "leaf" chameleons, from mainland Africa.

Distribution
The exact distribution differs between sources, but includes at least Cameroon, Equatorial Guinea, and Gabon, and may include the Central African Republic, the Republic of the Congo, and Nigeria.

Description
They are small, not exceeding , with very short, albeit prehensile, tails. They tend to frequent the ground and low shrubbery in forested areas.

This species is capable of color change, but generally in somber shades of tan to gray.  It also has a ventral stripe from the eye to above the base of the tail which, however, is not always displayed in lieu of plain ground colors. It is capable of quite striking coloration in the form of streaks and blotches.

In spite of their small size, plain color, and often terrestrial habits, they are otherwise very much like the larger chameleons in possessing independently rotating eye sockets, opposable digits on the front and back feet, and projectile tongues. Males may be differentiated from females by their wider tail bases.

Behavior
They are extremely sedentary, and not territorial (unlike other chameleons). They eat small invertebrates. Their reproductive habits are poorly known.  These animals seem to prefer cooler temperatures.

References

Rhampholeon
Lizards of Africa
Reptiles of Cameroon
Vertebrates of the Central African Republic
Reptiles of Equatorial Guinea
Reptiles of Gabon
Reptiles of West Africa
Reptiles of the Republic of the Congo
Reptiles described in 1874
Taxa named by Reinhold Wilhelm Buchholz